Palinuro is an Italian small town, the most populated civil parish (frazione) of  Centola, Province of Salerno, in the Campania region.  The name of the town is derived from Palinurus, the helmsman of Aeneas, as recorded in the fifth and sixth books of the Aeneid.

Geography 

Palinuro lies on the southern side of Cilento, on the Tyrrhenian Sea and in the northern part of Cape Palinuro.  The town, situated at the estuaries of the Lambro and Mingardo rivers, is also the main port of the comune. It is 7 km from Centola, 8 km from Marina di Camerota, 10 km from Pisciotta and 80 km from Salerno.

Tourism 
Palinuro is part of the Cilento and Vallo di Diano National Park, an area of "shrubland" typical of Mediterranean countries.

It is a tourist destination, especially in summer, due to the cleanliness of its waters and its beaches; and is regularly awarded five stars Blue Flag 
The town is also known for the caves along its coast, which are regularly visited, especially by divers.

Transport
The town is linked to Salerno and Naples by hydrofoils. The nearest main road is 10 km to the north, connecting Salerno-Battipaglia-Paestum-Agropoli-Vallo della Lucania-Policastro-Sapri.

The nearest railway station, Pisciotta-Palinuro (on the Naples-Reggio Calabria line) is 8 km to the north and is linked to the town by regular buses.

Culture 
The Arco Naturale beach of Palinuro was selected as a location in various films including Jason and the Argonauts (1963), Hercules and the Captive Women, and Clash of the Titans.

See also 
 San Severino (Centola)
 Cilentan language
 Cilento and Vallo di Diano National Park

References

External links 

 Palinuro (website)
 Municipality of Centola

Frazioni of the Province of Salerno
Coastal towns in Campania
Localities of Cilento